Keratosis pilaris atropicans includes many forms of keratosis pilaris with cicatricial alopecia.  Variants include keratosis pilaris atrophicans faciei, atrophoderma vermiculatum, keratosis follicularis spinulosa decalvans, and ichthyosis follicularis.

See also
Cicatricial alopecia
List of cutaneous conditions

References

 
Conditions of the skin appendages